Nick Ridler from the National Physical Laboratory, in Middlesex, England, was named Fellow of the Institute of Electrical and Electronics Engineers (IEEE) in 2014 for contributions to traceability in precision high-frequency electromagnetic measurements.

References

Fellow Members of the IEEE
Living people
Year of birth missing (living people)
Place of birth missing (living people)